The 1986 Minnesota House of Representatives election was held in the U.S. state of Minnesota on November 4, 1986, to elect members to the House of Representatives of the 75th Minnesota Legislature. A primary election was held on September 9, 1986.

The Minnesota Democratic–Farmer–Labor Party (DFL) won a majority of seats, defeating the majority of the Independent-Republicans of Minnesota. The new Legislature convened on January 6, 1987.

Results

See also
 Minnesota Senate election, 1986
 Minnesota gubernatorial election, 1986

References

1986 Minnesota elections
Minnesota House of Representatives elections
Minnesota